James K. Randall (June 16, 1929 - Cleveland, Ohio ; May 28, 2014 - Princeton, New Jersey) was an American composer, music theorist, and early adopter of electronic music. At the time of his death he was Professor of Music Emeritus at Princeton University.

Life and career

James Kirtland Randall was born in Cleveland, Ohio to Margaret ("Miggie") Wright Randall and Edwin Templeton Randall.  Miggie Randall was a violin teacher at the Cleveland Institute of Music and brought young James up as a music prodigy, with the ambition that he would become a famous piano player.  When James was 17, a piano sonata that he composed was played at Carnegie Hall by his teacher, Leonard Shure.

James went on to get a BA at Columbia University, an MA at Harvard University and an  MFA at Princeton (studying with Milton Babbitt.)  He also taught for four years at the US Navy School of Music while on active duty.  He joined the faculty of Princeton University in 1957.

At Princeton, he became a pioneer in electronic music, working from the very early days of punch cards. Music from that time includes Lyric Variations for Violin and Computer, Quartets in Pairs, and Quartersines.

Later, he did a great deal of free-wheeling improvisation, then late in life came back to composing for piano (the GAP series) and MIDI (a garland of Midi, My Prayer for Bella).

Though Randall's music was mostly heard within the small world of academic music, it occasionally reached a wider audience, for instance on the radio show "Schickele Mix" :

He also wrote about music, published at first in Perspectives of New Music. Many of his writings took the form of highly experimental prose poems.  A typical footnote from Compose Yourself -- A Manual for the Young (1972) reads:

1.) (pfung! ; !pfung(

The publication of Compose Yourself caused a major financial backer to remove his support from Perspectives of New Music. While J.K. Randall's early works were set in conventional type, in his later writings he often used his own calligraphy.

Randall's writings are collected in the 2-volume set Being About Music (with Benjamin Boretz). Much of J.K. Randall's work is published by Open Space and a large collection of his manuscripts and papers is held in the J. K. Randall Collection of the New York Public Library for the Performing Arts.

J.K. Randall was married to Ruth Hochheimer Randall for 62 years.  They had 3 children together; Ellen, Thomas, and Beth.

Compositions

Writings 
Haydn: String Quartet in D major, op. 76, no. 5, Music Review, 1960
Pitch-Time Correlations, written 1962
Godfrey Winham: Composition for Orchestra, Perspectives of New Music, 1963–64
Convertible Counterpoint in the Strict Style (1906) by Serge Ivanovitch Tanaiev JMT, 1964
Three Lectures to Scientists, Perspectives of New Music, 1967
  Compose Yourself -- A Manual for the Young, Perspectives of New Music, 1971 - 1974
A Soundscroll, Perspectives of New Music, 1975
How Music Goes, Perspectives of New Music, 1976
ADVT. --> repeat after me, Perspectives of New Music, 1979–80
Are You Serious?, Perspectives of New Music, 1985 
)something medieval), Lingua Press, 1988
Ten Thoughts about Lyric Variations, 1993
It's all Yours/ A Note on GAP 6, Open Space Magazine 3, 2001
On Facing Front, Open Space Magazine 5, 2003
What is it About ABOUT?, Open Space Magazine 5, 2003
Being About Music, 2 vols. Collected writings of J.K. Randall and Ben Boretz, 2003
Liner Notes to "Shouldn't we Talk?", 2003
When the Birds Come Calling (A Public Meditation on Two Recent Compositions by Ben Boretz), Open Space Magazine 8/9, Special Supplement, 2006 - 07. 
To Astonish the Roses, Open Space, 2013.

References

Further reading
Mackey, Steven (18 June 2014). "Jim (J.K.) Randall (1929-2014)—Out of View of Anything Resembling the Mainstream". New Music Box
Rahn, John (1992).  "Another Lecture: Notes on Another Lecture and J. K. Randall", pp. 238           –248. Perspectives of New Music, Vol. 30, No. 1 
Swift, Richard (1964). "The Demonstrations of J. K. Randall", pp. 77–86. Perspectives of New Music, Vol. 2, No. 2 
Chippewa, Jef (2005).  "Being About Music: Tracing the American Post-War Musical Consciousness"
Gleason, Scott (2013). "Princeton Theory's Problematics"
tENTATIVELY, a cONVENIENCE (2013).  Review of J.K. Randall's To Astonish the Roses

External links 
J. K. Randall Discography at Discogs
Princeton University Memorial Blog
J. K. Randall's YouTube Channel
Composers and Computers:  Episode 02:  Composers in the Computer Center

J. K. Randall on video 
Interview with J. K. Randall (New York Public Library)
JKR memorial on vimeo
Milton Babbitt:  Portrait of a Serial Composer (contains footage of J. K. Randall)

1929 births
2014 deaths
American music theorists
American male composers
Pupils of Milton Babbitt
Princeton University faculty
20th-century American composers
Harvard University alumni
21st-century American composers
Musicians from Cleveland
Columbia University alumni
Princeton University alumni
20th-century American male musicians
21st-century American male musicians